Oxynoemacheilus atili, the Lake Beyşehir loach, is a species of stone loach from the genus Oxynoemacheilus. It is endemic to Turkey being found only in the drainage basin of Lake Beyşehir in Central Anatolia, where it occurs in all the streams and in the Manavgat drainage in Mediterranean basin.

The fish is named in honor of Mr. Ahmet Tuncay Atil.

References

atili
Taxa named by Füsun Erk'akan
Fish described in 2008